Domenica is a Greek rock band that was formed in Athens in 1994.

Releases
Their first releases included several tracks on compilation albums with various other artists. Their personal debut album, " Άχρηστα Ρολόγια " (Useless clocks), was released in November 1999. 

Their next release in April 2002 had the title " Μέσα στη βουή του δρόμου "(In the roar of the street) and the title track became a success. 

In March 2004, Domenica had their third release, " Ιστορίες για μικρούς και μεγάλους "(Stories for children and adults), and the song "Λίγη ζωή ακόμη" (Some more life) also became a hit single and received an award.

In 2007, they released  " Χίλιες φορές έτσι "(A thousand times that way).

In 2009, they released the album " Λήθη "(Oblivion) and in 2012 a single called 'Μια ματιά σου μπορεί' (A look of you is enough).Domenica have set to music a certain number of poems by Napoleon Lapathiotis and Mitsos Papanikolaou.

In 2018 they released " Perase i ora? " a tribute album for the twenty years in discography.

In Augoust 2021 a new song has digitally released called " Sigrou"

In December 2022 they released "Storgi"

Awards
In 2003 Domenica were nominated for and won an Arion Music award for "Best band of entekhno". In April 2005, they were once again nominated for and won the Arion Music award for 
"Best alternative album". In June 2005, they won the Mad Video Music award for "Best rock video".

Discography

Ahrista rologia (1999, Harvest-EMI)
Mesa sti voui tou dromou (2002, Lyra)
Istories gia mikrous ke megalous (2004, Sony)
Hilies fores etsi (2007, Lyra)
Lithi (2009, Amuse)
Perase i ora? (2018, Amuse)
Storgi (2022, Amuse)

References

External links
Youtube

Greek rock music groups
Arion Music Awards winners
MAD Video Music Awards winners
Musical groups from Athens